Reg or REG may refer to:
 Reginald (disambiguation)
 Reg or desert pavement
 Raising for Effective Giving, a charity
 Random event generator (parapsychology)
 Raptor Education Group
 Regal Entertainment Group
 Regular language
 .reg MS Windows registry file extension
 Registration, such as for a motor vehicle
 Abbreviation of regina, queen, on coins or in law
 Reg (film), a BBC television drama
 Reg, the robot in the children's animated TV show Rubbadubbers
 Reg group in the C-lectin protein family
 Richard E. Grant
Reg, a character from the Made in Abyss franchise

Places 
 Reg, Iran, a village in South Khorasan Province
 Reg, Gilan, a village in Gilan Province
 Reg District (Helmand), Afghanistan
 Reg District (Kandahar), Afghanistan
 Reggio Calabria Airport

See also 
 Regular (disambiguation)